was a Japanese avant-garde jazz and jazz fusion trumpeter.

Career
Kondo was born in Ehime Prefecture. He attended Kyoto university in 1967, and became close friends with percussionist Tsuchitori Toshiyuki. In 1972 the pair left university, and Toshiyuki went on to work with Peter Brook, while Kondo joined Yosuke Yamashita. In 1978 he moved to New York, and began performing with Bill Laswell, John Zorn, Fred Frith, and Eraldo Bernocchi. A year later he released his first recording, toured Europe with Eugene Chadbourne, and collaborated with European musicians such as Peter Brotzman. Returning to Japan, he worked with Ryuichi Sakamoto, Kazumi Watanabe, and Herbie Hancock. In the mid-1980s he began focusing on his own career, blending his avant-garde origins with electronic music. In the 1990s he was part of the collective called Die Like a Dog whose first album Fragments Of Music, Life And Death of Albert Ayler was released in 1994.  In 2002, he worked on an international peace festival in Hiroshima after being approached by the Dalai Lama about organizing one. He was a former member of Praxis. Kondo cooperated with Bill Laswell to make the album Inamorata in 2007.

He founded the band Kondo IMA in 1984. Kondo IMA achieved commercial success but moved to Amsterdam to be alone and to start "Blow the Earth" in 1993. They started "Blow the Earth in Japan" in the summer of 2007 and ended in the autumn of 2011. The film Blow the Earth in Japan is his first experience as a film director.

Personal life
On October 17, 2020, he died in Kawasaki City, aged 71.

References

External links
 Toshinori Kondo Official Web Site 
 
 

1948 births
2020 deaths
Jazz fusion trumpeters
Japanese jazz trumpeters
Japanese jazz musicians
Japanese electronica musicians
Avant-garde jazz trumpeters
Musicians from Ehime Prefecture
21st-century trumpeters
Globe Unity Orchestra members
Okka Disk artists